"The Lame Shall Enter First" is a short story by Flannery O'Connor. It appeared first in The Sewanee Review in 1962 and was published in 1965 in her short story collection Everything That Rises Must Converge. O'Connor finished the collection during her final battle with lupus. She died in 1964, just before her final book was published. A devout Roman Catholic, O'Connor often used religious themes in her work.

Plot summary 
The main character Sheppard is a middle-aged widower whose wife died a year before the story. An atheistic rationalist, he consoles himself with humanitarian causes, and regards the grief of his young son, Norton, as a form of selfishness. Ironically, while Sheppard devotes himself to helping the boys in the local reform school, he cannot sympathize with Norton's grief and resulting foibles. Sheppard tells Norton that his mother is dead and no longer exists, and frequently berates him for his lack of reason and altruism.

Sheppard invites Rufus Johnson, a fourteen-year-old juvenile delinquent, to live with them against Norton's wishes. Johnson has a high IQ and a clubfoot, and was raised by his violent pentecostal grandfather. Sheppard desperately wants to enlighten Johnson, to turn his life around by teaching him about science and buying him a telescope to expand his horizons. 

Johnson holds Sheppard in contempt and strongly believes in God and the Devil, but believes that he himself is evil and resists all of Sheppard's naive attempts to help him. Though Sheppard buys him an orthopedic shoe, Johnson refuses it, quoting the words of Jesus that "the lame shall enter first" into the kingdom of heaven. Against Sheppard's wishes, Johnson tells Norton that his mother is in heaven above the earth, and he will only see her again if he dies as a child before he is corrupted. Norton eventually thinks he sees his mother through the telescope, but Sheppard dismisses such nonsense. 

The story ends with Johnson being taken away by the police for a burglary, which Johnson committed just to embarrass his patron Sheppard. Sheppard feels a wave of remorse over his treatment of his own son, and runs up to the attic to find that Norton has hanged himself on a rafter above the telescope.

References

Short stories by Flannery O'Connor
1965 short stories
Southern Gothic short stories